Copenhagen Tapes is a live album by Tim Buckley. It was recorded in Copenhagen, Denmark on October 12, 1968 and was broadcast later on Danish radio. The live performance features songs from Happy Sad, however "I Don't Need It to Rain" was only recorded in concert (see Live at the Troubadour 1969 for the other circulating take) and no studio version is believed to exist.

Track listing
All songs by Tim Buckley
"I Don't Need It to Rain" – 21:37
"Buzzin' Fly" – 6:28
"Strange Feelin'" – 8:59
"Gypsy Woman" – 12:37

Personnel
Tim Buckley – Guitar, Vocals
Lee Underwood – Guitar
Niels-Henning Ørsted Pedersen – Double bass
David Friedman – Vibes

References

Tim Buckley live albums
2000 live albums